Stereoloba is a genus of moths of the family Oecophoridae.

Species
Stereoloba diphracta (Lower, 1920)
Stereoloba melanoplecta (Turner, 1917)
Stereoloba promiscua (Meyrick, 1922)

References

Markku Savela's ftp.funet.fi

 
Oecophorinae
Moth genera